Buscaline (3,5-dimethoxy-4-butoxyphenethylamine) is a chemical compound prepared as a possible psychedelic drug.  It is an analog of mescaline. Buscaline was first synthesized by Alexander Shulgin. In his book PiHKAL, the minimum dosage is listed as 150 mg, and the duration is "several hours". Buscaline produces no psychedelic or psychoactive effects, but causes heart arrythmia and light diarrhea.  It does not cause any visuals or insights. Very little data exists about the pharmacological properties, metabolism, and toxicity of buscaline.

See also 
 Phenethylamine

References

Phenethylamines
Pyrogallol ethers